Achanta Vemavaram is a village in Achanta Mandalam, West Godavari district, Andhra Pradesh, India. The nearest railway station is Palakollu located at a distance of 10.57 Km.

Demographics 

As of the 2011 Census of India, Achanta Vemavaram had a population of 7566. The total population constitutes 3809 males and 3757 females with a sex ratio of 986 females per 1000 males. 580 children are in the age group of 0–6 years, with a sex ratio of 993. The average literacy rate stands at 80.99%.

References

Villages in West Godavari district